Dekh Indian Circus is an Indian film directed by Mangesh Hadawale. It provides an entertaining metaphor for rural India's struggle to access the supposed economic miracle of that South Asian nation. The film premiered at the 16th Busan Film Festival in the New Currents section, opening to positive review from critics and winning the Audience Choice award.

Nawazuddin Siddiqui and Tannishtha Chatterjee won the best actor and actress awards for this movie at the 12th annual New York Indian Film Festival (NYIFF).

Plot
Kajro (Tannishtha Chatterjee) and Jethu (Nawazuddin Siddiqui) are fulfilling the eternal Indian dream of educating their children Ghumroo (Virendra Singh Rathod) and Panni (Suhani Oza).  Kajro, the resilient mother, in the face of adversity inculcates great values in her children. Jethu as the mute patriarch suffers the day-to-day heartbreaks in silence.

Set in the present-day deserts of Rajasthan, the story line is about the daily trials and tribulations of the family and depicts the aspirations of rural India. Aspirations have arrived at every doorstep, but the means are far behind.

In the backdrop of state elections, a circus has come to a nearby town that may be Panni and Ghumroo's only escapade to a fantasy world without any heartbreak. A flag on the door could be the key to this escape. Would Jethu and Kajro find it easy to see a small dream of their children come true or would they themselves become puppets in the circus of life?

Cast

Tannishtha Chatterjee as Kajaro, who lives in the rural part of the country, can be compared to the modern, urban, empowered woman of today. Her thoughts and values are deeply rooted in Indian tradition and culture. From a very young age she has been independent and strong willed.
Nawazuddin Siddiqui as Jethu, belongs to the ‘Rabari’ community of Rajasthan. He resembles the ‘son of the soil’. His community comes under the broad classification of the nomadic tribe that moves from place to place. Jethu is a very loving and caring husband and a father. He and Kajaro were childhood sweethearts, and he has tremendous faith and trust in her.
Virendra Singh Rathod as Ghumroo: the seven-year-old child of Jethu and Kajaro. He is mostly in his school uniform or the Rabari costume. He also sports some Rabari accessories. He has big bright eyes. They reflect honesty and purity. They are deep and intense and are a mirror of his soul that is equally pure and genuine.
Suhani Oza as Panni, the five-year-old daughter of Kajaro and Jethu. She resembles her mother in many ways especially the sharp features. Panni is a cute and an innocent-looking girl. She exudes sweetness from the way she talks and childlike mannerisms.

Music
The soundtrack of the film is composed by Shankar–Ehsaan–Loy, while the lyrics are penned by Prasoon Joshi. The score is done by Wayne Sharp.

Reception
The film received overwhelmingly positive reviews from the critics. Richard Kuipers of Variety praised it for "bringing the themes of inequality and class divisions together in the highly entertaining visit to the big top." Kirk Honeycutt in his review for The Hollywood Reporter, praised director Mangesh Hadawale for portraying third-world issues through a family comedy that contains a stinging satire of contemporary India and its rampant corruption.

Awards
 12th New York Indian Film Festival
 Won- Best Actor - Nawazuddin Siddiqui
 Won- Best Actress - Tannishtha Chatterjee
 16th Busan International Film Festival
 Won- Audience Choice Award
 60th National Film Awards
 Won- National Film Award for Best Children's Film
 Won- National Film Award for Best Child Artist - Virendrasingh Rathore
 Won- National Film Award – Special Jury Award / Special Mention (Feature Film) - Nawazuddin Siddiqui
 Won- National Film Award – Special Jury Award / Special Mention (Feature Film) - Tannishtha Chatterjee

References

2010s Hindi-language films
2011 films
Indian satirical films
Films about corruption in India
Rajasthani-language films
Best Children's Film National Film Award winners